Edward Lunn Young (September 7, 1920 – May 9, 2017) was a Republican U.S. Representative from South Carolina.

Biography
Young was born in Florence, South Carolina.  He graduated from Clemson College (now Clemson University) in 1941.   Not long after graduating, he joined the United States Army Air Forces and served as a fighter pilot in the Pacific during the last part of World War II.  He was awarded the Distinguished Flying Cross and the Air Medal with nine oak leaf clusters.

After World War II, he stayed in the reserves for one year and was discharged as a major.  He then returned to Florence and worked as a farmer, real estate broker and businessman.

Young was elected to the South Carolina House of Representatives as a Democrat from Florence County in 1958 and served one term.  He became a Republican sometime in the early 1960s and was active in state Republican politics, attending the state Republican conventions of 1968 and 1970.  He was also a delegate to the 1968 Republican National Convention.

He expected to face 17-term Democratic incumbent John L. McMillan, the longest-serving congressman in South Carolina history, in the general election. However, in a considerable upset, McMillan was defeated in the Democratic primary by a considerably more liberal candidate, State Representative John Jenrette. Due to the gigantic Republican landslide of that year, Young won the general election by over nine points, becoming the first Republican in history to represent this part of South Carolina.

Young's tenure in Congress was short-lived, however.  The Republican Party did not have strong roots in this part of the state at the time, so Young was particularly vulnerable in the 1974 elections, which saw a nationwide backlash against Republicans due to Watergate.  Jenrette sought a rematch against Young, and this time won by four points.  Another rematch in 1976 resulted in Young being soundly defeated.

Young was the Republican candidate for Governor in 1978, but was soundly defeated by Democratic State Senator Richard Riley.
When Jenrette was ensnared by Abscam in 1980, Young jumped into the Republican primary, only to be soundly defeated by John Light Napier, who went on to defeat Jenrette in November.

After his 1980 defeat, Young retired from politics. He died in his sleep on May 9, 2017.

References

Sources

1920 births
2017 deaths
People from Florence, South Carolina
Military personnel from South Carolina
Clemson University alumni
South Carolina Democrats
Members of the South Carolina House of Representatives
United States Army Air Forces officers
United States Army Air Forces pilots of World War II
Recipients of the Air Medal
Recipients of the Distinguished Flying Cross (United States)
Republican Party members of the United States House of Representatives from South Carolina
20th-century American politicians
Candidates in the 1978 United States elections
Candidates in the 1980 United States elections